F.C. Copenhagen is a Danish football club based in the nation's capital city, Copenhagen. Formed in 1992 as the result of a merger between Kjøbenhavns Boldklub and Boldklubben 1903, the club has competed in UEFA competition in all but one season of its existence. Their best season came in the 2010–11 UEFA Champions League, when they became the first Danish team to reach the round of 16 in the competition. They reached the quarter-finals of the 2019–20 UEFA Europa League, the first time they had reached that stage of any UEFA competition.

Record

By competition
Accurate as of 2 November 2022

Source: UEFA.comPld = Matches played; W = Matches won; D = Matches drawn; L = Matches lost; GF = Goals for; GA = Goals against; GD = Goal Difference. Defunct competitions indicated in italics.

Results

Best results
UEFA Champions League
 Round of 16: 
2010–11

UEFA Europa League/UEFA Cup
 Quarter-finals: 
2019–20
 Round of 16: 
2016–2017
 Round of 32: 
1992–93, 
2001–02, 
2008–09, 
2009–10, 
2017–18

UEFA Europa Conference League
 Round of 16: 
2021–22

UEFA Cup Winners' Cup
 Round of 16:
1997–98, 
1998–99
 Round of 32:
1995–96

UEFA club coefficient ranking

Current
As of 12 August 2020, Source:

Rankings since 2006

Source:

References

F.C. Copenhagen
Danish football clubs in international competitions